Darren Payne (born 1 July 1974) is a former Australian rules footballer who played with Fitzroy in the Australian Football League (AFL).

Recruited to Fitzroy from Doncaster Heights, Payne played six league games, over the course of three seasons. He crossed to Box Hill in 1996 and won their best and fairest award that year.

References

1974 births
Australian rules footballers from Victoria (Australia)
Fitzroy Football Club players
Box Hill Football Club players
Living people